An exotic derivative, in finance, is a derivative which is more complex than commonly traded "vanilla" products.  This complexity usually relates to determination of payoff; see option style.
The category may also include derivatives with a non-standard subject matter - i.e., underlying -  developed for a particular client or a particular market.

The term "exotic derivative" has no precisely defined meaning, being a colloquialism that reflects how common a particular derivative is in the marketplace. As such, certain derivative instruments have been considered exotic when conceived of and sold, but lost this status when they were traded with significant enough volume. Examples of this phenomenon include interest rate- and currency-swaps.

As regards valuation, given their complexity, exotic derivatives are usually modelled using specialized simulation- or lattice-based techniques. Often, it is possible, to "manufacture" the exotic derivative out of standard derivatives. For example, a knockout call can be "manufactured" out of standard options; see . This latter approach may then be preferred, and also allows for a benchmark against which the more specialized models may be verified.

See also

Exotic option
Financial engineering 
Financial innovation
Structured product

References

External links
Understanding derivative contracts: types of derivatives, HM Revenue & Customs
Exotic Derivatives and Structured Products, Sébastien Bossu, University of Chicago
Exotic Derivatives , Prof. Jim Gatheral, Baruch College
Exotic Equity Derivatives Manual, Salomon Smith Barney (1998)
Guide to Exotic Credit Derivatives, Lehman Brothers
A Day in the Life of an Exotic Derivatives Trader, quantnet.com

Derivatives (finance)